Gravitcornutia camacae is a species of moth of the family Tortricidae. It is found in Bahia, Brazil.

The wingspan is 10.5 mm. The ground colour of the forewings is yellowish cream with brownish-yellow strigulae (fine streaks) and dots. The hindwings are brown cream.

Etymology
The species name refers to the type locality.

References

Moths described in 2010
Gravitcornutia
Moths of South America
Taxa named by Józef Razowski